Daniel J. Carroll (November 29, 1874 – March 6, 1927) was an American businessman and politician from New York.

Life
He was the son of Lawrence F. Carroll, sometime Warden of the Raymond Street Jail in Brooklyn. He attended the public schools. Then he engaged in the bottling and sale of mineral water.

Carroll was a member of the New York State Senate from 1913 to 1920, sitting in the 136th, 137th, 138th, 139th, 140th, 141st (all six 7th D.), 142nd and 143rd New York State Legislatures (both 11th D.).

He was again a member of the State Senate (11th D.) from 1923 until his death in 1927, sitting in the 146th, 147th, 148th, 149th and 150th New York State Legislatures.

He died on March 6, 1927, at his home in Brooklyn, of pneumonia with complications of erysipelas and diabetes.

In August, his son Laurence F. Carroll (born c. 1903) tried to take over the vacant Senate seat: he was defeated in the Democratic primary, but was substituted on the ticket by the Republicans after the regular Republican nominee had withdrawn. At the special election in November 1927, he was defeated by Democrat Louis J. Jacobson.

Sources
 OWENS TESTIFIES AGAINST CARROLL in NYT on November 19, 1913
 SENATOR CARROLL OF BROOKLYN DEAD in NYT on March 7, 1927 (subscription required)
 SEEKS SENATE SEAT OF HIS LATE FATHER in NYT on August 26, 1927 (subscription required)

1874 births
1927 deaths
Democratic Party New York (state) state senators
Politicians from Brooklyn
Deaths from pneumonia in New York City